Guiscardo Améndola (1906–1972) was a Uruguayan painter who graduated from the Academy of Fine Arts, Naples.

1906 births
1972 deaths
People from Montevideo
20th-century Uruguayan painters
Male painters
Accademia di Belle Arti di Napoli alumni
20th-century Uruguayan male artists
Uruguayan expatriates in Italy